Herbert Sandin (29 February 1928 – 27 December 2007) was a Swedish footballer. He played in five matches for the Sweden national football team from 1951 to 1953. He was also named in Sweden's squad for the Group 2 qualification tournament for the 1954 FIFA World Cup.

References

1928 births
2007 deaths
Swedish footballers
Sweden international footballers
Association footballers not categorized by position